Mihai Țârlea (born 10 September 1964) is a Romanian former football forward and manager. His father, who is also named Mihai Țârlea was also a footballer who played at UTA.

International career
Mihai Țârlea played two games for Romania. He scored in his debut, a friendly which ended 2–2 against Greece.

Honours
UTA Arad
Divizia B: 1992–93

Notes

References

External links

1964 births
Living people
Romanian footballers
Romania international footballers
Association football forwards
Liga I players
Liga II players
FC UTA Arad players
FC Sportul Studențesc București players
Romanian football managers
Sportspeople from Arad, Romania